The Man-Machine is the seventh studio album by German electronic music band Kraftwerk. It was released on May 1978 by Kling Klang in Germany and by Capitol Records elsewhere. A further refinement of their mechanical style, the album saw the group incorporate more danceable rhythms. It includes the singles "The Model" and "The Robots".

Although the album was initially unsuccessful on the UK Albums Chart, it reached a new peak position of number nine in February 1982, becoming the band's second highest-peaking album in the United Kingdom after Autobahn (1974).

Artwork 
The artwork for the cover was produced by Karl Klefisch, based on the work of the Russian suprematist El Lissitzky – the words "Inspired by El Lissitzky" are noted on the cover. The back cover image is an adaptation of a graphic from Lissitzky's book for children About Two Squares: A Suprematist Tale of Two Squares in Six Constructions.

Release 
The Man-Machine was released in May, 1978. The Man-Machine was certified gold by the British Phonographic Industry (BPI) on 15 February 1982 In October 2009, a remastered edition of the album was released on CD, Vinyl and digital formats by Mute Records, and Astralwerks.

Critical reception

Reviewing the album in 1978, Andy Gill of NME stated that "The Man-Machine stands as one of the pinnacles of  rock music", adding that "the sparsity of the lyrics leaves the emphasis squarely on those robot rhythms, chilling tones and exquisite melodies". Village Voice critic Robert Christgau also reviewed the album that year, saying: "Only a curmudgeon could reject a group that synthesizes the innovations of Environments and David Seville & the Chipmunks, not to mention that it's better make-out music." Mitchell Schneider from Rolling Stone found that the "chilling restraint and relentless sameness" of the lyrics and music are tempered by Kraftwerk's sense of humour and "sheer audacity", which makes for a listening experience that is "strangely pleasant in an otherworldly way".

Tony Clayon wrote in The Irish Times which "they constitute the resilient framework of electro-pop and electronica we hear today. And if there are more simple, warm and beautiful pieces of electronic music out there than Ohm Sweet Ohm, Neon Lights, Europe Endless and the title track of Autobahn." Uncut critic David Cavanagh called "The Model" a "wry pop satire" and wrote that "the sparse lyrics lend themselves to considerable interpretation".

In a retrospective review for AllMusic, Steve Huey wrote that the album is "less minimalistic in its arrangements and more complex and danceable in its underlying rhythms" than the group's previous works, and noted its "tremendous impact" on subsequent synth-pop artists. He also described it as "closer to the sound and style that would define early new wave electro-pop", and noted its "feel of a divided concept album", with some songs (such as the title track and "The Robots") exploring "the science fiction-esque links between humans and technology", and others (such as "Neon Lights" and "Metropolis") celebrating "the glamour of urbanization". NME ranked The Man-Machine as the 57th greatest album of all time in 2013, citing it as Kraftwerk's "definitive" album and the catalyst for the synth-pop "revolution" that followed its release. Paste magazine ranked it the 11th best album of 1978.

Track listing

Personnel
Credits adapted from the liner notes of the 2009 remastered edition of The Man-Machine.

Kraftwerk
 Ralf Hütter – album concept, artwork reconstruction (2009 remaster), cover, electronics, keyboards, Orchestron, production, Synthanorma Sequenzer, synthesiser, vocoder, voice
 Florian Schneider – album concept, electronics, production, synthesiser, vocoder, Votrax
 Karl Bartos – electronic drums
 Wolfgang Flür – electronic drums

Additional personnel
 Günther Fröhling – photography
 Leanard Jackson – engineering
 Karl Klefisch – artwork
 Joschko Rudas – engineering
 Henning Schmitz – engineering assistance
 Johann Zambryski – artwork reconstruction (2009 remaster)

Studios
 Recorded at Kling Klang Studio in Düsseldorf, Germany
 Mixed at Studio Rudas in Düsseldorf, Germany

Charts

Weekly charts

Year-end charts

Certifications and sales

References

External links
 

1978 albums
Kraftwerk albums
Albums produced by Florian Schneider
Albums produced by Ralf Hütter
Capitol Records albums
German-language albums
Synth-pop albums by German artists
Rock albums by German artists
New wave albums by German artists
Electropop albums